Arthur Phillips Murphy (December 10, 1870 – February 1, 1914) was a U.S. Representative from Missouri.

Born in Hancock, Missouri, Murphy attended the public schools of Pulaski County and the School of Mines and Metallurgy at Rolla, Missouri.
He became a telegraph operator and later studied law. He was admitted to the bar March 4, 1894, and commenced practice in Rolla, Missouri.
Murphy was an unsuccessful candidate for election as prosecuting attorney of Pulaski County in 1898.

In 1902, Murphy was appointed by President Theodore Roosevelt as attorney for the Creek Nation of Indians, a position he held until 1904.

Murphy was elected by Missouri's 16th congressional district as a Republican to the Fifty-ninth Congress (March 4, 1905 – March 3, 1907), early within which he sponsored a bill for Sequoyah statehood, though it was not considered. He was an unsuccessful candidate for reelection in 1906 to the Sixtieth Congress.

Murphy was elected to the Sixty-first Congress (March 4, 1909 – March 3, 1911). He was an unsuccessful candidate for reelection in 1910 to the Sixty-second Congress, and resumed the practice of law.

After a sudden death in Rolla, Missouri, on February 1, 1914, Murphy was interred in Rolla Cemetery.

References

1870 births
1914 deaths
20th-century American politicians
Missouri lawyers
Missouri University of Science and Technology alumni
Republican Party members of the United States House of Representatives from Missouri
19th-century American lawyers